Events in the year 1884 in Brazil.

Incumbents
Monarch – Pedro II
Prime Minister – Lafayette Rodrigues Pereira (until 6 June), Manuel Pinto de Sousa Dantas (starting 6 June)

Events

Births
 1 January - Bertoldo Klinger

Deaths

References

 
1880s in Brazil
Years of the 19th century in Brazil
Brazil
Brazil